Allai is a tehsil of Batagram District in Pakistan's Khyber-Pakhtunkhwa province. It is home to the Allai Valley.

History

2005 earthquake
The Allai valley was affected by the Kashmir earthquake on October 8, 2005. The earthquake destroyed the cableway that allowed residents to cross the Indus River.

Administration
Allai is one of the two Tehsils, or subdivisions, of the Battagram District. Allai contains eight Union Councils:

Geography 
The Allai Valley is bounded by Kohistan on the north and east by the Kaghan valley, Nandhiarh and Deshi of Deshiwals on the south, and by the Indus river on the west. Forests cover the mountain slopes at the eastern end.

See also
 Batagram District
 Batagram Tehsil

References

Tehsils of Khyber Pakhtunkhwa
Populated places in Battagram District